Arabic pop music or Arab pop music is a subgenre of pop music and Arabic music.

Arabic pop is mainly produced and originated in Cairo, Egypt; as Egyptian music genre is by far the most widespread within the region.
Also Beirut, Lebanon, and Gulf states come as secondary centers. It is an outgrowth of the Arabic film industry (mainly Egyptian movies), also predominantly located in Cairo. Since 2000, various locations in the Gulf countries have been producing Khaleeji pop music.

The primary style is a genre that synthetically combines pop melodies with elements of different Arabic regional styles, called ughniyah or in English "song". It uses a wide variety of instruments, including electric guitars or electronic keyboards, as well as traditional Middle Eastern instruments like the oud, darbukka or qanun and many more.

Another characteristic aspect of Arabic pop is the overall tone and mood of the songs. The majority of the songs are in a minor key, and the lyrics tend to focus on longing, melancholy, strife, and generally love issues.

Songwriting, recording and distribution formats
The road to Arab stardom is very different from the one in the Western world. Traditionally, a certain producer creates the full song from music to lyrics, no matter the talents of the performer. Most music is recorded in studios as is Western Pop music.  But also several live albums have been popular, such as with Asalah and Egyptian legend Umm Kulthum.

Music has been released as single records, later replaced with cassettes in the album format, and by the late 1990s, and 2000s, additionally on CDs. Singles were not released separately, but just airplay is common. By the mid 2010s, they have been increasingly released on streaming services which allowed singles to be released again as soon as they become available.

There are no official charts or certifications due to the informal nature of the business and bootlegging.

In the mid 2000s, Ringtone charts were occasionally made, but due to bootlegging, they were supposedly highly inaccurate. There are several awards in different countries awarded in different ways according to their organizations. In fact, bootlegging is so common that most bootleggers have their own brands. They are so bold that they usually put contact info on the front of the CDs.  Bootlegging is such a major problem that most artists cannot rely on royalties for income.  Most of the actual musical income came from ringtone downloads, which was more prevalent than in the West. Other income comes from endorsement deals and live performances.

Live performances are mainly brokered through the record label. This includes public concerts, such as at arenas or major media events. However, performances at weddings and private parties are common and well paid, no matter the artist's level of fame.

Music TV channels and music shows such as Arabs Got Talent are popular in the Middle East and North Africa, where some 40 Arab music channels exist. Rotana is the most popular company, running six TV channels, a record label, and a roster of more than 100 of the top Arab pop artists.

The business side
There are vast differences between the Western Music business and the Arabic Music business.

Unlike in the West, there are rarely managers, agents or PR systems. Record labels are usually mega corporations that control music videos, music channels, and distribution as well as the artists' careers, such as endorsement deals or booking gigs. Music videos generally are similar to videos in the Western world, often with a storyline and dance scenes. Producers, song writers and composers are usually affiliated with certain labels. An aspiring Arab singer creates a video demo and sends them to satellite channels that specialize in that area. It is then up to a record label to see them on such a program and sign them.

By means of the Internet and social media, regional cooperation between Arab pop musicians, producers and studios has become more feasible than ever before. Thus, Arab pop or even underground musicians can reach their audiences across the region and beyond.

Artistic expression and public response 
Most Arab pop concentrates on romantic themes, hence the frequent use of words like habibi (my darling) and qalbi (my sweetheart). Explicit references to sexuality and topics forbidden by Islam, including alcohol, are rare. So is the overt mention of politics, reflecting the limited democratic rights in the region, but international conflicts such as the Gulf War sometimes inspire songs such as "Saddam Saddam", a 1991 hit in support of Saddam Hussein.

Arab pop music videos are most popular among local youth in the Levant and North Africa. The Gulf countries are well-known to ban or censor music videos they deem inappropriate. Lebanon, Jordan, Syria, Tunisia, and Morocco show the least tendency to censor or ban music videos, while Egypt has been known to ban overtly sexual and explicit music videos.

Although tame by Western standards, female Arab popstars have been known to cause controversy with their sexuality. Playful lyrics, skimpy costumes, and dancing have led to quite a bit of criticism in the more conservative Islamic circles. Artists such as Lydia Canaan, Samira Said, Nancy Ajram, Nawal El Zoghbi, Latifa, Assala, Amal Hijazi and Haifa Wehbe have all come under fire at one time or another for the use of sexual innuendos in their music. This has led to bans on their music and performances in certain countries; particularly in Haifa's case. Lydia Canaan's provocative costumes made her a sex symbol. The Daily Star wrote: "On stage, with her daring looks and style, Canaan became a role model". In 2002, a video by Samira Said called "Youm Wara Youm" was banned by the Egyptian Parliament for being 'too sexy', similar to Nancy Ajram's music video "Akhasmak Ah". In addition Amal Hijazi's music video of "Baya al Ward" was heavily criticised and banned on a few music channels. Such extremes are rare, but such kinds of censorship are not uncommon for Arab female popstars.

As in other countries, Arab pop stars also have been engaged in social issues, for example during the COVID-19 pandemic.

Audiences of Arabic pop
Though particularly popular among the youth and young adult Arab population, Arabic pop has found an audience with older fans as well. Most fans of Arabic pop live in the Arab World, but Arabic pop has also continually charted in Europe since the 1990s, especially in the French Top 20. Arabic pop has fans in communities of immigrants from Arabic speaking countries, particularly in France, the United Kingdom, Australia, Ukraine, Canada, and the United States. Further fan bases come from DJs playing Arabic pop in dance venues or from Western belly dance fans.

In Australia, SBS Radio plays Arab pop on a radio format called PopAraby. Many artists speak several languages and have songs in various languages, especially French and Spanish.

History of Arabic pop

Early days: 19th-early 20th century
The early days of Arabic pop featured a more traditional style of music. Artists such as Umm Kulthum, who is now considered an Arabic music legend, made it acceptable for female singers to perform in public.

In some cases, the performers wrote their own lyrics, but the music was written by others. Both lyrics and music were in characteristic Arabic styles, and songs tended to last well over 10–30 minutes. Several of Umm Kulthum's songs were measured in hours.  Performances were broadcast over the radio, and live tours were organized. The songs could have been compared to Western Jazz for their improvisation and to Opera for their traditional elements and length.

Modernization: 1950s–1970s 
During this period, Arabic pop began to emerge, although the older style of the early days was still extremely popular. Songs began to become more westernized in sound and length (now around 5–20 minutes). Artists such as Abdel Halim Hafez or the Lebanese superstar Fairuz rose to fame during this period.

1970s–1980s 
In the 1970s with the rise of Western artists such as ABBA and the death of the early artists such as Umm Kulthum, Arabic pop began to take shape. By the early 1980s artists such as the Lebanese soprano Majida El Roumi, Samira Said and Laila Ghofran rose to fame with their Western sounding Arabic pop.

1990s–present 
By the mid to late 1990s, a new style of Arabic pop stars became popular, defining the genre as it is known today. Artists such as Amr Diab, Elissa, Sherine, Nawal Al Zoghbi, Wael Kfoury, Assi El Hallani, Diana Haddad, Kadim Al Sahir, Nancy Ajram and Haifa Wehbe rose to fame, using modern marketing, both Arabic and Western electronic instruments, as well as catchy melodies.

See also

 List of Arabic pop musicians
 Arabesque music
 Raï
 Arabic music
 Al Jeel
 Chalga
 Turbo-folk
 Pop-folk
 Mizrahi music
 Nasheed
 Laiko
 Coma Dance Festival

References

Literature 
 Andrew Hammond. Pop Culture Arab World!: Media, Arts, and Lifestyle. — ABC-CLIO, 2005. — 393 p. — .
 Robert A. Stebbins. Work and Leisure in the Middle East: The Common Ground of Two Separate Worlds. — Routledge, 2017. — 227 p. — .

External links
 Music and modernization in the Arab world - Reason Magazine
 A Little War Music - by Robert Christgau for the Village Voice, 1991
 Flamenco and Arabic Pop - A popular radio show

Pop music
Pop music genres
20th-century music genres